The Living Edens was a Public Broadcasting Service series that aired from 1997 to 2003. Narrators included Peter Coyote and Linda Hunt. It was partially funded by Reader's Digest in exchange for various marketing rights.

Episodes
The series consist of 25 episodes:

Denali - Alaska Great Wilderness
(Feb. 5, 1997)There is a place on Earth where an Alaskan wilderness spreads over more than six million acres like a living tapestry at the foot of the tallest peak in North America. Here, seasons of unfathomable extremes march beneath a mountain known as The Great One. In Denali's fierce winter, 20 hours of darkness and temperatures dipping nearly 100 degrees Fahrenheit below zero are routine; in summer, 20 hours of sunlight. Grizzly bear, wolf, moose, ground squirrel and golden eagle have each found their own way to live in this sub-Arctic eco-system where life pulses in a series of harsh, dark winters, framed by the light of June and August. In this land of extremes, plants and animals alike must be strong to survive. The place is an Eden called Denali.

Patagonia - Life at the End of the Earth
(Apr. 30, 1997)
Journey to the end of the earth, where the Andes stand like giant skyscrapers above a land of vicious and beautiful extremes. Patagonia has stood in its aloof majesty - untouched by modern civilisation - for millennia. This is a place where strange and awesome creatures like the guanaco, elephant seal, rhea, penguin and armadillo are totally adapted to a kingdom of endless and punishing winds. Here, the Andean condor reigns over a mystical landscape. Come discover this Eden where only nature's most adaptable creatures flourish beneath the peaks of snowy mountain towers, icy glaciers and petrified rock.

Namib - Africa Burning Shore
(Jul. 16, 1997)
There is a 1200-mile strip of land off the southwestern coast of Africa where the searing Namibian desert meets the frigid Atlantic sea. Here the basic elements of the earth exist in paradoxical extremes. Namib, the hottest of lands, is obscured in mist created by the Benguela, one of the coldest of ocean currents. Fur seals and penguins divide their time between the sandy shore and the icy water of the sea, while elephant, ostrich, springbok, hyena roam the wind-swept dunes. Ingenious adaptations to this ancient desert's extreme heat allow these and other creatures to survive in an Eden called Namib.

Manu - Peru Hidden Rainforest
(Nov. 12, 1997)
Along the eastern base of the Peruvian Andes is a great river named Manu, the life blood for one of the world's great secrets - the Manu Biosphere Reserve. This Eden is the richest Amazonian wilderness on Earth. As mist rises off the great river, howler monkeys issue the wake up call it is morning in the rain forest. Hundreds of parrots form a brilliant kaleidoscope as they feast on the cliff-side clay. Giant otters take their first swim in the cool waters while sloths get a slow start to their day beneath the mystical canopy. Discover what the day will bring in this mysterious tropical paradise where 90 per cent of the flora and fauna have yet to be identified.

Etosha - Africa Untamed Wilderness
(Feb. 11, 1998)
There is a place on earth where all life is pushed to the limits of endurance - a landscape of stark beauty and brutal extremes where survival is constantly challenged. Southwestern Africa's Etosha is a vast and ancient land of seasonal paradox. During the bloom of the wet season, lions, cheetahs, elephants, jackals, giraffes, springboks and zebras continue the timeless cycle of life in glorious abundance. But at the peak of its scorching dry season, the heart of Etosha is a parched and blistered wasteland where drought and thirst endanger predator and prey alike. For those who survive its harshest interval, Etosha becomes, once again, a Living Eden.

Bhutan - The Last Shangri-La
(May 13, 1998)
Here in a place an Eden where time stands still - where nature and religion have combined to turn a tiny Buddhist kingdom into the world's last Shangri-La. Locked between Tibet and India, Bhutan is the jewel of the Himalayas. To the north of the kingdom, towering virgin peaks rise to 25,000 feet. Beneath steep glacial walls, alpine highlands fall to misty forests. Mountain streams cut through gorges on their way down to warmer valleys and wide marshes in the heart of the kingdom. One distinct landscape drops to the next before finally descending to the jungles and grasslands of the southern plains. For the people who have adapted to this domain of extremes, Bhutan is a Living Eden where respect for life, in all its many incarnations, endures like the land itself.

Palau - Paradise of the Pacific
(Jul. 15, 1998)
Far to the east of India and Indonesia is a place where the sea hides a treasure of living riches - a secret corner of the ocean where ancient species still thrive in dazzling abundance, wildness and wonder. It sits alone at the edge of the vast Pacific Ocean, sheltered from time and the outside world. As lush as any paradise of our imagination, it is not one emerald island but an archipelago of more than two hundred, nearly all uninhabited. Along its submerged shoulders flourish some of the richest coral reefs remaining on Earth. In the reefs' shadows, life seeks shelter from the open water. This place is called Palau, a Living Eden where all is not what it seems - a home to a world of novelties concocted by nature unconstrained.

Madagascar - A World Apart
(Nov. 4, 1998)
Three hundred miles off the east coast of Africa lies an island forgotten by time. A place where evolution has taken the familiar and created the bizarre. Separated from the mainland for over a hundred million years, life here has followed its own Darwinian path. Home to a host of creatures found nowhere else - this is an alternate world where lush rainforests fall to sun-scorched plains and trees seem to stand with their roots in the sky. Preserved by its isolation, this wondrous realm is a land unlike any other.

South Georgia Island - Paradise of Ice
(Jan. 20, 1999)
In the South Atlantic Ocean amid huge, frozen glaciers and giant ice floes, a range of rough, ice-capped mountains rise up to form Antarctica's liveliest neighborhood: South Georgia Island. At 106 miles in length, this imposing icy island regularly endures storm winds in excess of 120 mph while nearby ocean waves swell to 50-foot heights. Home to bull elephant seals and the wandering albatross, this stark, snowy land boasts the world's largest penguin population. Frigid and windswept, it is an unlikely living Eden. But South Georgia Island is both a haven and a paradise - one of the world's true wonders and the single most important nesting and breeding ground on Earth.

Borneo - Island in the Wild
(Apr. 28, 1999)
As the Earth's third largest island, Borneo straddles the equator, carved up between Indonesia, Malaysia and Brunei. The island is dominated by Kota Kinabalu, a massive outcrop of rock more than 13,000 feet high and the tallest peak in South East Asia. Far below, warm morning mists shroud the rainforest, concealing the exotic creatures teeming in and below the canopy. The vast jungle provides shelter for some of the rarest, strangest and most magnificent creatures on Earth. It is a Living Eden both rich and fragile - a self-contained world of surprises and transformations.

Kakadu - Australia Ancient Wilderness
(Jul. 14, 1999)
Over hundred kilometres from Australia's north coast, the Yellow Waters and the South Alligator Rivers cut through an ancient limestone plateau to create Kakadu National Park. This is a rich natural world where nature has sculpted rainforest niches and deep gorges that fill with wild rivers with each monsoon. Here, the mighty saltwater crocodile reigns supreme. In the rivers, up the creeks and on the shores, the saltwater crocodile swims, hunts and lays eggs. Living alongside this giant prehistoric reptile are wallabies, pig-nosed turtles, king brown snakes, water lizards and hundreds of species of brightly coloured birds. For the Aborigines, the first humans to live here, there is no afterlife paradise is here and now in a Living Eden called Kakadu.

Canyonlands - America's Wildwest
(Nov. 17, 1999)
Deep in the vast American West lies a high, lonely land called the Colorado Plateau. Lying mostly in Utah, it extends south into Arizona and east into Colorado. In the very heart of the plateau lies a geological spectacle where millions of years of exposure to weather and the chiseling force of the Colorado River has created a labyrinth of pinnacles, chasms, arches, gorges and canyons. It is not just form, but colour that creates the beauty of this rugged place. The varied mineral content of the layers of rock creates an entire palette of hues that change as the sun moves through the sky from canyon rim to canyon rim. This Living Eden is a stark and untamed wilderness, home to an incredible array of creatures that instinctively embody the spirit of the West. From the elusive mountain lion to the resourceful coyote, only the strongest survive in Canyonlands.

Kamchatka - Siberia Forbidden Wilderness
(May 10, 2000)
Jutting south from the far east of Siberia lies an isolated and mountainous peninsula where volcanoes, geysers and bubbling hot springs create the smoke, steam and fire that prevail in this icy and remote place. This harsh and beautiful land is home to the densest population of grizzly bears in the world and the biggest brown bears in Eurasia. Siberian bighorn sheep, silver foxes, sables, mink and black-capped marmots have all adapted to the severe climate. Walruses, northern fur seals, sea lions dot its coastline, and bowhead whales breed in the waters just offshore. Millions of salmon swim in its streams while the world's largest eagles soar above all that make Kamchatka a living Eden. Narrated by Linda Hunt.

Thailand - Jewel of the Orient
(1999)
On the shores of the Andaman Sea lies a lush tropical paradise called Thailand, a peninsular finger reaching down from the Southeast Asian mainland as if to touch the equator. Thailand's jungles are the domain of tigers. Elephants amble through the dense forest while white-handed gibbons swing from branch to branch. This is a mysterious world of flying snakes and lizards where cobra is king. Beneath the warm surrounding waters, brilliant coral reef shelters bustling aquatic life while sharks, manta rays and octopus continue their timeless ballet in the shadow of this tropical Living Eden. This episode is dedicated to the memory of Kenneth Houseman, Helen Gromme and Mark Graham, that lost their lives in a plane crash, while they were directed to Surat Thani in order to meet an ABC/Kane team, with whom they were producing a documentary on Thailand's wildlife.

Ngorongoro - Africa Cradle of Life
(Jul. 26, 2000)
Nearly three million years ago, a massive explosion tore apart an enormous stratovolcano in Eastern Africa's Great Rift Valley to form the Ngorongoro Crater, one of the true wonders of the world. Today, the Ngorongoro Crater is a microcosm of African life enclosed in one unique place. From grasslands, wetlands and lakes to forests and slopes, the crater provides habitats for Africa's creatures both great and small. This Living Eden is a glorious stage where lions, hyenas, cheetahs, jackals, vultures, servals and wildebeest act out a dramatic story of life and death that was set into motion so long ago.

Anamalai - India Elephant Mountain
(Nov. 8, 2000)
As the Western Ghats fall away into the heat and haze of India's Deep South, a solitary mountain rises up from the hot, dusty plains of Tamil Nadu. Seen from a distance, the mountain's silhouette is uncannily familiar: the sweep of the trunk and characteristic bulging forehead. It is an unmistakable profile. It is called Anamali - the Elephant Mountain. Here the elephant roams free and unmolested for it is the living embodiment of Ganesh, the Remover of Obstacles. Among stands of rosewood, cardamon and bamboo are forest temples to the elephant-headed deity, perhaps the most popular in the Hindu pantheon. The late Anne Bancroft narrates as we traverse the sacred ground of this living Eden, "home of gods", "lords of protection".

Yellowstone - America Sacred Wilderness
(Jan. 31, 2001)
Yellowstone is a hive of activity. Paul Schullery has been watching wildlife here for 30 years and is one of the world's leading authorities on the park. As he guides us through this fresh, sunlit environment, wolves and grizzly bears mount extraordinary chase sequences in their quest for elk, and mountain lions gambol about without worry. Dramas occur in every season, for Yellowstone isn't just the world's first National Park - it's one of the great success stories in wildlife conservation.

Costa Rica - Land of Pure Life
(May 29, 2001)
The misty rain forests, rivers and beautiful white sand beaches of Costa Rica are home to one of the most diverse assemblages of life on Earth. Along the coast, giant crocodiles fight for the right to mate, while in the trees, troops of capuchin, squirrel and howler monkeys, as well as resplendent quetzals and beautiful songbirds, forage for food above the forest floor that is home to Hercules beetles, deadly army ants and poison dart frogs. On the sandy beaches hatchling sea turtles emerge by the thousands to race to the safety of the sea and, though few survive and reach open ocean, enough return to lay their eggs and complete the cycle of life unique to this Eden called Costa Rica.

Tasmania - Land of the Devils
(Jun. 12, 2001 Tasmania: Land of the Devils)
Off the southeast coast of Australia is the island refuge of Tasmania. Safe from the forces that have changed much of the Australian continent, Tasmania is an Eden of magnificent forests, snow-capped mountain ranges, giant waterfalls, wild rivers and pristine coastlines. Tasmania is also the home of the largest marsupial carnivore - the Tasmanian Devil. Voracious eaters with powerful jaws, they often leave behind only the jawbone of their prey. Some of the oldest trees on earth, Huon pines over 2,000 years old, and the tallest flowering tree, the Swamp Gum, share this unique island with wallabies, bettongs, quolis, tiger snakes and ground parrots. Off the coast, giant kelp forests and sponge gardens host the prehistoric handfish, king crab, sea dragons, red velvet fish and deep sea anglerfish, many of which are found nowhere else on earth.

Glacier Bay - Alaska Wild Coast
(Nov. 20, 2001)
Nestled in the heart of southeast Alaska, Glacier Bay is a wild paradise of ocean and ice. This film chronicles the lives of brown bears, bald eagles, humpback whales and other charismatic species. Nearly all life here is ultimately tied to the salmon, and the heroic migration of these fish provides the thread that weaves together the remarkable fabric of life in this story. Glacier Bay, a stunning formation of fjords, is the centre stage for this great drama.

Temple of the Tiger - India Bandhavgarh Wilderness
(May 5, 2002)
Once a hunting preserve for the Indian Maharajas, Bandhavgarh National Park is one of the most important tiger habitats remaining in Asia. Within the park, an abandoned palace harbours a flourishing population of tigers, bats, cobras, and monkeys who share their domain with a solitary temple priest. The dominant male tiger that has ruled this domain for years is now being challenged by a younger, stronger male.

Patagonia: Tuxedo Junction
(Jun. 16, 2002) Observing penguins in Argentina, as the birds reacquaint themselves during the breeding season after a long separation. Included: mating rituals and nest building. Narrated by Betsy Ames.

Big Sur - California Wild Coast
(Nov. 24, 2002)
It has been called the greatest meeting of land and sea in the world. The Santa Lucia Mountains rise precipitously from the Pacific Ocean just south of Monterey on the central Californian coast. A sometimes violent, yet fragile place, Big Sur challenges the senses. Here air, water, land and life combine in spectacular fashion and provide refuge for a host of creatures including condors, falcons, blue whales, great white sharks and elephant seals. Wait for the morning fog to rise and enter this vast and impenetrable Big South Country.

Arctic Oasis - Canada Southampton Island
(Dec. 21, 2003)
During the Arctic spring and summer, one of Earth's most dazzling displays of rejuvenation takes place in Canada's far north. A brief season of light and plenty brings great migrations of bowhead and beluga whales, harp seals, caribou, and polar bears. It also brings an Inuit hunter whose aim is to teach his 12-year-old son the traditional survival skills of his ancient people.

The Lost World - Venezuela Ancient Tepuis
(Sep. 14, 2003)
The inspiration for Sir Arthur Conan Doyle's, The Lost World and home to the world's tallest waterfall, Venezuela's plateaus form a strange and isolated wilderness.

Related 
 Planet Earth
 The Blue Planet
 The Living Planet
 Nature (PBS)
 NOVA (PBS)

References

External links 
 PBS' Living Edens homepage

PBS original programming
BBC Radio programmes
1997 American television series debuts
2003 American television series debuts
Television series by CBS Studios
1990s American documentary television series
2000s American documentary television series
1990s American animated films